A male genital disease is a condition that affects the male reproductive system. The human male genitals consists of testes and epididymides, ductus deferentes, seminal vesicles and ejaculatory ducts, prostate, bulbourethral glands, and penis.

Classification by type of disease

Infection

Aetiological agents

Bacterial
 Erythrasma
 Balanoposthitis
 Fournier's Gangrene

Fungus
 Candidiasis
 Tinea cruris

Parasites
 Cutaneous larva migrans
 Pubic lice
 Scabies
 Tick

Virus
 Molluscum contagiosum
 Herpes: simplex, zoster

Cancers
The probability of contracting a cancerous development depends on age, ethnicity and the existence, or non-existence, of environmental causation.  Unlike all other genitally situated cancers, the incidence of penis cancer is related to the sexual mode of transmission.

Inflammation
An example of a male genital disease is orchitis.

Classification by location of disease

Penis
 Mondor's disease is a non-common disease
 Peyronie's disease is diagnosed when there is evidence of scar tissue formation within the tunica albuginea, tissue which contributes to the maintenance of the erectile state

Prostate
The three most statistically frequently occurring diseases of the prostate gland are benign hyperplasia (a swelling of the gland, not due to cancerous accumulation), prostatitis (inflammation), cancer (which is the accumulation of malignant cells in the gland)

See also
Female genital disease

References

External links 

Male genital disorders